A postpipe or post pipe is the remains of an upright timber placed in a posthole. Given the right conditions, timbers may survive over long periods of time and a recovered postpipe can be of solid wood. Under less preservative conditions, only a dark circular stain of organic material may be left in the fill of the posthole observable in plan and section. This differs in consistency from the less organic backfill of the posthole and can be identified through this change in makeup. The size and depth and of the postpipe can provide information as to any reuse of the posthole especially if several different postpipes can be identified. They can also indicate the species of wood used and help suggest the nature of the structure that the timber once supported.

See also
Excavation (archaeology)

Archaeological features